Vice-Admiral Alistair Bruce Donaldson  is an officer in the Royal Canadian Navy.

Career
Donaldson completed bachelor's degrees in political science and economics from Carleton University and a master's degree in international relations and maritime strategic studies from Dalhousie University. He also attended the Canadian Forces College, graduating the Command and Staff Course and the National Security Studies Course.

Donaldson received his officer commission in the Canadian Forces in the naval reserves in 1977.  He joined the regular force in 1982 as a navigation specialist with Maritime Command (MARCOM).  He then served as a weapons officer, combat officer and executive officer.

Donaldson was appointed Vice Chief of the Defence Staff and promoted to the rank of Vice-Admiral effective July 26, 2010. He retired from this post in September 2013.

Awards and decorations
Donaldson's personal awards and decorations include the following:

100px

References 

Carleton University alumni
Dalhousie University alumni
Vice Chiefs of the Defence Staff (Canada)
Canadian admirals
Commanders of the Order of Military Merit (Canada)
Living people
Year of birth missing (living people)